Bremerton is a city in Kitsap County, Washington. The population was 43,505 at the 2020 census and an estimated 44,122 in 2021, making it the largest city on the Kitsap Peninsula. Bremerton is home to Puget Sound Naval Shipyard and the Bremerton Annex of Naval Base Kitsap. Bremerton is connected to downtown Seattle by two ferries: a 60-minute ferry that carries both vehicles and walk-on passengers, and a 28-minute Fast Ferry that carries passengers and a limited number of bicycles.

Geography
Bremerton, the largest city in Kitsap County, is located directly west of Seattle across Puget Sound on the Kitsap Peninsula. It is bounded on the southeast and east by Sinclair Inlet and the strait of Port Orchard respectively. The city is divided by the Port Washington Narrows, a strait spanned by two bridges that connect the eastern and western sides of the city. The part of the city northeast of the narrows is referred to as East Bremerton. The city limits extend to the southwest as far as the Mason County line and include Bremerton National Airport. Bremerton is bordered to the south, across Sinclair Inlet, by the city of Port Orchard.

Neighborhoods

Downtown
The ferry terminal and waterfront are the heart of downtown. As Bremerton's historic center, downtown has seen the most dramatic change over the last decade, with blighted blocks being replaced by new apartments, and older buildings being restored. Attractions include Harborside Fountain Park, a boardwalk, and multiple naval history museums. The Admiral Theatre, a restored 1942 Art Deco theater, is Bremerton's most prominent venue for live music and entertainment. The district is known for breweries, coffeeshops, art galleries, and restaurants showcasing diverse cuisines. The city is in the beginning stages of creating a public square on Fourth Street to honor local music icon Quincy Jones.

Manette
Across the water from Downtown is Manette, a neighborhood on a separate peninsula that functioned as its own town from 1891 to 1930. It was annexed by Bremerton in 1918, and the first Manette Bridge was completed in 1930. Today, Manette is connected to Bremerton via the new Manette Bridge, completed in 2011.

Charleston

Charleston was formerly an independent town built to house and entertain sailors, and was annexed by the city in 1927. The neighborhood's center is Callow Avenue, a retail corridor anchored by The Charleston music venue. Charleston is a designated center in Bremerton's comprehensive plan, and has seen recent improvements to its streetscape. Charleston is casually defined by 11th Street to the north, Naval Avenue to the east, 1st Street to the south, and Cambrian Avenue to the west.

Union Hill
Between Charleston and Downtown is the Union Hill neighborhood. Its borders are Naval Avenue to the west, 11th Street to the north, Warren Avenue to the east, and the Naval Shipyard to the south. Union Hill is a predominantly residential neighborhood, showcasing Bremerton's most historic churches and a synagogue along Veneta Avenue. Near Veneta and 6th is a popular local diner, Noah's Ark; Bremerton's most architecturally notable place of worship, Our Lady Star of the Sea Catholic Church; non-native towering sequoias; and a large park.

Evergreen
North of downtown's 11th Street boundary is the Evergreen neighborhood, anchored by Evergreen Park and bordered to the west by Warren Avenue. Evergreen Park offers beach access and a boat ramp, and hosts a weekly farmer's market in the summer. Evergreen is characterized by residential neighborhoods and water views.

Haddon
West of Evergreen and north of Union Hill and Charleston is Haddon. Haddon's center is Lulu Haddon Park, but Bremerton High School and Olympic College's campus are main focal points as well. Though it is an older, sleepier neighborhood traditionally more connected with the shipyard and local business, the Haddon neighborhood has recently gained notice for quirky local breakfast diner Hi-Lo's and an English style barrelhouse, Hale's Ales.

Politics
Bremerton is divided among three state legislative districts in Kitsap County, the 23rd legislative district to the north, 35th legislative district in the center and 26th legislative district to the south.

Before redistricting in 2012, the line separating the first and sixth Congressional districts ran through East Bremerton. As a result of the 2012 redistricting, all of Bremerton now lies within the sixth Congressional district. The district is represented by Derek Kilmer, who was first elected to that position in 2012. Prior to Kilmer, Norm Dicks served as sixth district Representative from 1977 to 2013.

The current mayor is Greg Wheeler. Incorporated as a first-class city, Bremerton has been governed by a nonpartisan strong mayor and seven-member city council since 1985. Each member is elected from one of seven districts who in turn elect one member as President. The current form of government was established by a 1983 charter that eliminated a decades-old city commission composed of a mayor, public works commissioner and finance commissioner.

Each member of the Kitsap County Board of Commissioners represents a portion of the city of Bremerton. This arrangement was an attempt to balance Bremerton's commercial influence with the remainder of the county, though most of its sales tax base has since relocated to unincorporated areas.

Bremerton politics can vary in intensity, with some city council positions regularly unopposed and others having as many as four candidates in the 2005 primary election, and seven candidates in the 2021 election. Redevelopment projects have been a major source of debate, including the 2007 construction of a federally funded tunnel that would route ferry traffic under the downtown core as well as a planned waterfront boardwalk extension. As with most cities in the region, Bremerton precincts have historically been more favorable for Democratic candidates in state and federal elections, contrasting with more conservative-leaning voters in rural areas of the county.

History

1890s
Bremerton is within the historical territory of the Suquamish people. The land was made available for non-Native settlement by the Treaty of Point Elliott of 1855. Bremerton was planned by German immigrant and Seattle entrepreneur William Bremer in 1891. This land was owned by the Bremer family. Three years earlier, a U.S. Navy commission determined that Point Turner, between the protected waters of the Sinclair and Dyes inlets, would be the best site in the Pacific Northwest on which to establish a shipyard. Recognizing the large number of workers such a facility would employ, Bremer and his business partner and brother-in-law, Henry Hensel, purchased the undeveloped land near Point Turner at the inflated price of $200 per acre. This land became part of the initial footprint of the Puget Sound Navy Yard.

1900–1930
Bremerton was incorporated on October 15, 1901, with Alvyn Croxton serving as the city's first mayor. Progress in the new city soon faced a major crisis, as Assistant Secretary of the Navy Charles Darling moved all repair work to the Mare Island Navy Yard in California in November 1902. Darling cited reports from commanders that the Bremerton waterfront was rife with prostitution, opium houses and frequent strongarmed robberies of sailors. Politics were probably also at play, as local newspapers reported that the city's incorporation left the shipyard essentially landlocked without room to expand. A dispute ensued between Mayor Croxton, who wanted to shutter all saloons in Bremerton, and three members of the city council, who attempted to block his efforts. Croxton eventually won out, and the council voted to revoke all liquor licenses in June 1904. With the ban, Darling reestablished the navy yard as a port of call. Saloons had begun to return to business within two years, however.

In 1908, the city library and Union High School were established to serve the educational needs of the 2,993 residents recorded in the 1910 U.S. Census. During World War I, submarine construction and the addition of a third drydock caused the shipyard's workforce to balloon to over 4,000 employees. Growth due to the war effort and the 1918 annexation of the city of Manette, east of Bremerton on the Port Washington Narrows, can be seen in the 1920 census, which reported a population of 8,918. Bremerton absorbed Charleston, its neighboring city to the south in 1927. The population reached 10,170 in 1930.

1930s
Manette was linked to Bremerton by the Manette Bridge, a  bridge constructed in June 1930. Prior to this time, the trip could only be made by ferry or a long trip around Dyes Inlet through Chico, Silverdale, and Tracyton on mostly unimproved roads. This wooden bridge was replaced with a concrete and steel structure in October 1949. It was replaced by the new Manette Bridge in 2011. At the shipyard, the  Hammerhead Crane No. 28 was completed in April 1933. One of the nation's largest, it is capable of lifting 250 tons and continues to dominate the Bremerton skyline.

1940s

At the peak of World War II, the Bremerton area was home to an estimated 80,000 residents due to the heavy workload of shipbuilding, repair and maintenance required for the Pacific war effort. Most of the relocation was temporary, though, and only 27,678 citizens were left in the city by 1950. During the 1940s, presidents Franklin D. Roosevelt and Harry S. Truman both visited Bremerton. Roosevelt made a campaign stop at the Puget Sound Naval Shipyard on August 12, 1944, giving a national radio address in front of a backdrop of civilian workers. During the course of his 35-minute speech, it is believed the president suffered an angina attack, experiencing severe chest and shoulder pain. An electrocardiogram was immediately administered once he left the podium, but it showed nothing abnormal. President Truman took a two-day tour of Washington state in 1948, speaking from the balcony of the Elks Club on the morning of June 10. Local legend has it that a man in the large Pacific Avenue crowd yelled the infamous "Give 'em hell, Harry!" line for the first time. This is a matter of dispute, however, as local newspapers quoted the man as having shouted "Lay it on, Harry!" Despite this, there is a bronze plaque attached to the corner of the building declaring that spot to be the place where the phrase "Give 'em hell, Harry" was first uttered.

With the return of World War II GIs to the homefront, the need for post-secondary education became evident to officials of the Bremerton School District. Olympic Junior College (now Olympic College), a two-year institution, opened its doors to 575 students in the fall of 1946. Initially, it operated in the former Lincoln School building, gradually moving operations to World War II–surplus Quonset buildings at its current 16th & Chester site. About 100 students received associate degrees at the first commencement exercises held June 10, 1948. President Truman was in attendance and received the college's first honorary degree. Operation of the college transferred from the school district to the state of Washington in 1967.

1950–1970
The 1950s and 1960s were a period of stability for the city. A second high school opened in 1956, and two comprehensive high schools operated in the city until 1978. Growth in East Bremerton necessitated the construction of another span across the Port Washington Narrows in 1958. The $5.3 million, four-lane Warren Avenue Bridge allowed for increased traffic on State Highway 21-B (now State Route 303).

The battleship USS Missouri, site of the Japanese surrender treaty signing that ended World War II, was assigned to the Pacific Reserve Fleet at PSNS in 1955. For 30 years, she served as the city's primary tourist attraction. Hundreds of thousands of visitors walked the "surrender deck" before the ship was recommissioned in 1985. She was decommissioned on March 31, 1992 (final), and her name was struck off the register on January 12, 1995. In 1998 "Mighty Mo" was donated to the USS Missouri Memorial Association and became a museum ship at Pearl Harbor, Hawaii.

Population growth was flat, with 26,681 enumerated in the 1960 census, leading Bremerton leaders to annex the shipyard the following year in an effort to include stationed sailors in those figures. While the Vietnam War spawned protests and sit-ins on the Olympic College campus, the city was relatively free of civil disorder during the 1960s.

1970s
Numerous failed proposals were made at redevelopment beginning in the early 1970s, including discussions of a waterfront hotel and the erection of a large canopy over the central business district. Meanwhile, most of the city's office and retail space remained in the hands of Edward Bremer, son of William Bremer and the sole remaining heir to his wealth. (In order to receive their inheritance, William Bremer's three children were honor-bound to never marry.) Bremer began to neglect his properties, never increasing decades-old lease rates and failing to make necessary maintenance upgrades. In 1978, the Bremerton City Council passed an ordinance declaring the entire downtown a "blighted area".

1980s
In 1985, Safeco subsidiary Winmar Corporation developed the Kitsap Mall in Silverdale. With lower taxes and minimal planning regulations in the unincorporated town, Silverdale achieved virtually unfettered growth. Sears, J.C. Penney, Montgomery Ward, Nordstrom Place Two, Woolworth and Rite Aid all closed their downtown Bremerton stores in the 1980s and 1990s. Upon the death of Edward Bremer in 1987, the Bremer properties were placed under the complete control of a trust held by Olympic College. Not being in the real-estate business, the college did not actively market its holdings, and the downtown was composed almost entirely of very large empty storefronts. , many buildings remained vacant.

1990–present

In recent years Bremerton has seen its share of community setbacks. Like many other West Coast cities, Bremerton school teachers were pitted against their district's administration for nearly a month in September 1994 during a contentious strike. Four elderly residents were killed in an enormous three-alarm fire that destroyed the 165-unit Kona Village apartment complex in November 1997. Damages were estimated at $7.5 million. A replacement senior apartment building has since been built.

Despite a hard-fought battle throughout the mid-1990s by local politicians to have the decommissioned and mothballed USS Missouri, already in the Bremerton Navy Yard, stay in Bremerton as a museum ship and tourist attraction, Secretary of the Navy John H. Dalton awarded the ship to the Pearl Harbor Naval Base, Hawaii, in 1998. It now sits near the USS Arizona Memorial to demonstrate where U.S. involvement in World War II started on December 7, 1941, and where it ended by the signing of the instrument of surrender by the Japanese on board the USS Missouri, on September 2, 1945.

Beginning with the building of a waterfront boardwalk and marina in 1992, Bremerton had begun the process of revitalizing its downtown community. That same year, the Bremerton Historic Ships Association opened the destroyer  to public tours at the end of the boardwalk; the ship was built in the Puget Sound area in 1958, commissioned in 1959, and had played a back-up role in the 1964 Gulf of Tonkin incident that further escalated U.S. involvement in the Vietnam War with the Congressional passage of the Gulf of Tonkin Resolution, allowing President Lyndon B. Johnson to send fighting troops in addition to the "advisors" already on the ground in Vietnam.

In 2000, Bremerton saw the opening of the waterfront multimodal bus/ferry terminal and a hotel/conference center complex in 2004. The high-rise Norm Dicks Government Center also opened that year, housing City Hall and other government offices. The Waterfront Fountain Park and Naval History Museum adjacent to the Bremerton Bus/Ferry Terminal opened in 2007, and a newly expanded marina with more boat capacity was completed in 2008. Plans to build an extension to the current boardwalk from the USS Turner Joy to Evergreen Park is in the litigation stage. Even though the boardwalk extension project is fully funded, opposition to the extension by the Suquamish Tribe concerning the impact to treaty fishing rights threatens the project. Fairfield Inn and Suites by Marriott, a 132-room hotel, opened in March 2010 on the site of the old City Hall building made obsolete by the new Norm Dicks Government Building.

Condominiums were built on the waterfront to lure more people to live and shop in the downtown area as part of the revitalization effort. However, construction delays and economic downturn forced the builder of the publicly funded Harborside Condominium complex, the Kitsap County Consolidated Housing Authority, to fall $40.5 million in debt. That debt later was taken on by Kitsap County, which hired a marketing firm to sell the remaining units at a lower-than-anticipated price. The privately built 400-condominium complex north of the Harborside complex opened shortly before the Harborside complex and also didn't sell as well as projected. The remaining empty condos were eventually sold at auction for a lower cost.

The  Harborside Fountain Park opened on May 5, 2007. Located on the waterfront just steps away from the Kitsap Conference Center, the park features five large copper-ringed fountains, wading pools, and lush landscaping. The park will also be home to the Harborside Heritage Naval Museum.

A tunnel underneath downtown, traversing from the ferry terminal to Highway 304 (Burwell Street), has been newly opened that allows for a smoother egress for vehicles exiting the car ferry and makes for a more pedestrian friendly downtown. A new fountain park above the tunnel blends water and art, along with the bow of a ship and the conning tower of a submarine as a tribute to the workers at the Bremerton Naval Shipyard over the years. The stations along the walk include pictures of the shipyard, workers, and shipbuilding and repair statistics.

The popular Blackberry Festival is held annually during Labor Day weekend on the waterfront boardwalk to celebrate everything blackberry. Local residents, shopkeepers and growers bring their blackberry ice creams, pastries, pies, jams, jellies, candies, and even ciders and wines to this annual event. Free entertainment includes music by local musicians and entertainers performing throughout the three-day festival, the Berry Fun Run, and the Blackberry Criterium Bike Race. Bremerton National Airport sponsors the annual Blackberry Festival Fly-In, with shuttle service provided by Kitsap Transit to the festival. As the festival's background story goes, the downtown waterfront of Bremerton where the festival takes place was a massive overgrowth of wild blackberry bushes that were removed to build the waterfront Fountain Park, Boardwalk, Marina and Bus/Ferry Terminal.

Climate
Bremerton has a Mediterranean climate (Köppen Csb), with warm dry summers and wet semi-mild winters. The city falls in USDA climate zone 8.

Demographics

Based on per capita income, one of the more reliable measures of affluence, Bremerton ranks 341st of 522 areas in the state of Washington to be ranked.

2010 census
As of the census of 2010, there were 37,729 people, 14,932 households, and 7,853 families residing in the city. The racial makeup of the city was 74.0% White, 6.7% African American, 2.0% Native American, 5.5% Asian, 1.3% Pacific Islander, 2.8% from other races, and 7.6% from two or more races. Hispanic or Latino of any race were 9.6% of the population.

There were 14,932 households, of which 27.5% had children under the age of 18 living with them, 34.4% were married couples living together, 12.9% had a female householder with no husband present, 5.3% had a male householder with no wife present, and 47.4% were non-families. 37.3% of all households were made up of individuals, and 12.2% had someone living alone who was 65 years of age or older. The average household size was 2.24 and the average family size was 2.93.

The median age in the city was 31.9 years. 19.5% of residents were under the age of 18; 17.1% were between the ages of 18 and 24; 29% were from 25 to 44; 22.5% were from 45 to 64; and 11.9% were 65 years of age or older. The gender makeup of the city was 53.1% male and 46.9% female.

Education
Public schools are operated by the Bremerton School District, Central Kitsap School District, and South Kitsap School District. College level education is offered by Olympic College.

Christ the King Lutheran School is a Pre-K-8 grade school of the Wisconsin Evangelical Lutheran Synod in Bremerton.

Sports and recreation
Bremerton was home to the Kitsap BlueJackets baseball team of the summer collegiate West Coast League until 2017.  It is also the home of the dissolved Kitsap Pumas soccer team in the USL Premier Development League (PDL). Its basketball team is the Kitsap Admirals in the American Basketball Association (ABA).  The Western States Hockey League had a presence in Bremerton as well with the addition of the (now defunct) West Sound Warriors.

Notable people

Arts and entertainment
 Dan Attoe, painter and sculptor
 Jill Banner, film actress
 Adelaide Hawley Cumming, vaudeville performer and radio host
 Avram Davidson, author and literary critic
 Howard Duff, actor, radio voice of Sam Spade, star of NBC television series Felony Squad and featured in many films; born in Charleston, now part of Bremerton
 Brent David Fraser, actor
 Geologic, lead rapper for Blue Scholars
 Elizabeth George, Christian author
 Ben Gibbard, musician
 Mike Herrera, bass guitarist vocalist for band MxPx
 Steven Holl, architect, born in Bremerton
 Quincy Jones, musician, producer, and songwriter
 Douglas Kahn, historian and theorist of media and the arts
 Clayton Kauzlaric, artist and game designer known for work on games Total Annihilation and Voodoo Vince
 Buddy Knox, singer and songwriter best known for 1957 rockabilly hit song "Party Doll"
 Jack Lenor Larsen, textile designer, author, and collector
 Gary Miranda, poet
 Pat O'Day (né Paul Berg), longtime KJR radio personality and general manager
 Joe Pichler, actor
 Dorothy Provine, actress
 Sango, music producer
 Tom Wisniewski, guitarist for band MxPx
 Heather Young, actress
 Gary20O, Youtuber

Athletics
 Nathan Adrian, swimmer and five-time Olympic gold medalist (8-time medallist overall), among 10 most decorated Olympic swimmers of all time, American record holder in 50 and 100-yard freestyle
 Buddy Allin, professional golfer who won five PGA Tour events in 1970s
 George Bayer, professional golfer on PGA Tour and Senior PGA Tour, won four PGA Tour events and one Senior 
 Willie Bloomquist, baseball player for Arizona Diamondbacks and Seattle Mariners, born in Bremerton and grew up in nearby Port Orchard
 Chuck Broyles, head football coach at Pittsburg State University
 Rondin Johnson, former MLB second baseman for Kansas City Royals
 Don Heinrich, American football player, coach, and announcer. He played professionally as a quarterback in National Football League (NFL) for the New York Giants and Dallas Cowboys, and in the American Football League (AFL) for the Oakland Raiders. Heinrich played college football at the University of Washington.
 Dana Kirk and Tara Kirk attended Bremerton High School and Stanford University; competed in 2004 Olympic Games,  first sisters to be members of U.S. Olympic swim team
 Mike Levenseller, football player
 Benji Olson, former offensive guard for NFL's Tennessee Titans, born in Bremerton and attended nearby South Kitsap High School
 Kevin Sargent, former player for NFL's Cincinnati Bengals
 Alex Smith, former NFL quarterback for the San Francisco 49ers, Kansas City Chiefs, and the Washington Redskins/Football Team; led University of Utah to victory in 2005 Fiesta Bowl; born in Bremerton
 John Stroeder, former professional basketball player
 Champ Summers, former professional baseball player
 Ted Tappe, former professional baseball player
 Marvin Williams, signed by NBA's Atlanta Hawks in 2005; as a senior at Bremerton High, averaged 28.7 points, 15.5 rebounds and earned McDonald's and Parade All-America honors; attended University of North Carolina at Chapel Hill and won 2005 NCAA Championship
 Marc Wilson, former quarterback for NFL's Oakland and Los Angeles Raiders and for the New England Patriots

Government and politics
 Frank Chopp, Washington State Speaker of the House, grew up in Bremerton
 Francis Cogswell, U.S. Navy captain and Navy Cross recipient
 Norm Dicks, 18-term U.S. congressman, born and raised in Bremerton as son of Puget Sound Naval Shipyard worker
 Mike Enzi, U.S. senator from Wyoming, born in Bremerton

Other
 Augusta Cohen Coontz, American First Lady of Guam
 Bill Gates Sr., father of the Microsoft multi-billionaire, born in Bremerton and began law career with local firm of Merrill Wallace; elder Gates' father operated furniture store and ice cream parlor in downtown Bremerton
 Margaret Grubb, first wife of pulp fiction author and Scientology founder L. Ron Hubbard
 Mary Beardslee Hinds, American First Lady of Guam.
 L. Ron Hubbard, Scientology founder, attended Union High School, wrote early works while living in Bremerton during late 1930s and early 1940s

Sister cities
Bremerton has the following sister cities:

  Kure, Japan
  Olongapo, Philippines

See also

 Bay Vista, Washington
 USS Bremerton, 2 ships

References

External links

 City of Bremerton official website
 Kitsap Peninsula Visitor and Convention Bureau
 Bremerton Chamber of Commerce
 Port of Bremerton

 
Cities in Washington (state)
Cities in Kitsap County, Washington
Cities in the Seattle metropolitan area
Port settlements in Washington (state)
Populated places established in 1891
Populated places on Puget Sound
1891 establishments in Washington (state)